Green Mothers' Club ( is a 2022 South Korean television series directed by Ra Ha-na and starring Lee Yo-won, Choo Ja-hyun, Kim Gyu-ri, Jang Hye-jin and Joo Min-kyung. It premiered on JTBC on April 6, 2022, and aired every Wednesday and Thursday at 22:30 (KST) with 16 episodes. It is also available for streaming on Netflix.

Synopsis 
A story depicting the friendships, motherly love, and growth of 5 mothers who met in the elementary community, each with a complex that they could not overcome.

Cast

Main 
 Lee Yo-won as Lee Eun-pyo
A highly educated mother from French studies who majored in aesthetics first, moves into their community and gets involved in all sorts of incidents.
 Choo Ja-hyun as Byun Chun-hee
The most powerful mother of popular in terms of beauty and information content.
 Kim Gyu-ri as Seo Jin-ha
A woman who has a handsome foreign husband with an innate elegance and a gifted son, creates a strange atmosphere as Eun-pyo's rival and best friend. 
 Jang Hye-jin as Kim Young-mi
 A mother who values ​​emotional connection with her child. “We must be in solidarity with a wise mother.
 Joo Min-kyung as Park Yun-joo
 Eun-pyo's cousin is a scoundrel who does nothing for education, creating other tangled stories.

Supporting

Eun-pyo's family 
 Choi Jae-rim as Jung Jae-woong 
 Eun-pyo's husband, a police detective. Looks bland but sharp. He has a knack of reading women's minds. He is unassuming and straightforward.
 Jung Chi-yul as Jung Dong-seok
 Eun-pyo and Jae-woong's son, Eun-pyo just thinks Dong-seok is a talkative and curious child. Because he was busy with school and had never met another mother in kindergarten, he Neglecting to compare and understand the status of the same person.
 TBA as Jung Dong-joo
 The second son of Eun-pyo and Jae-woong's son.

Chun-hee's family 
 Choi Deok-moon as Kim Joo-seok
An anesthesiologist and Chun-hee's husband. He had the arrogance to see everyone under his feet.
 TBA as Kim Young-bin
 Chun-hee and Joo-seok's son.
 Joo Ye-rim as Kim Yu-bin
 The daughter of Chun-hee and Joo-seok, A young woman who is smart, lively and emotionally honest. If you didn't get into the high class, even if your mom wouldn't tell you to do it. You simply cannot stand by yourself.

Jin-ha's family 
 Choi Gwang-rok as Louis Bunuel / Louis 
Eun-pyo's ex-boyfriend and Jin-ha's current husband. He betrayed Eun-pyo and fell for Jin-ha. He is a French citizen of Korean descent which is Jin-ha's husband and currently works at the pharmaceutical company GM.
 Shin Seo-woo as Henry Bunuel
 The son of Jin-ha and Louis, Characteristics that cannot be considered Earthling, plus a language genius who speaks five languages.

Young-mi's Family 
 Im Soo-hyung as Oh Geon-woo
 Young-mi's husband and famous as a genius film director.
 Ahn Seok-hyun as Chulpin
 Son of Young-mi and Geon-woo,Children living with stepfather Geon-woo as their mother remarried. Chulpin is playful, can't stay still and stir.
 Jeon Yu-na as Saebeom
 Young-mi and Geon-woo's daughters. Children living with stepfather Geon-woo as their mother remarried. Saebeom, who has just entered puberty. Afraid of her stepfather's fury and sensitivity. and resenting her assertive mother in pursuing only her ideals.

Yun-joo's family 
 Yoon Kyung-ho as Lee Man-su 
 Yun-joo's husband, a timid and passive office worker, is the only stigmatized person to watch TV with a beer after work 
 Park Ye-rin as Lee Soo-in  
 Yun-joo's daughter, An 8-year-old elementary school student who grew up a little faster.

Others 
 Lee Ji-hyun as Jeong-suk 
 A teacher at an elementary school located in Sangsu-dong with a fierce passion for education.
 Lee Seon-hee as Bang Jeong-hee
 Someone who has both the wealth and power of the aristocracy. A mother who supports her child's education immensely. and is the chairman of the University Foundation
 Joo In-young as Jae-bin's mother
 She is friends with Yun-joo and Chun-hee.
 Jeon Su-ji as Min-ji's mother
 She is friends with Chun-hee and Yun-joo. She likes to listen to gossip and rumors.
 Sung Byung-suk as Hyung-im 
 A strong mother who raised Eun-pyo with the utmost sincerity while working at the paint shop. Even so, he often felt sorry for his daughter Eun-pyo. which made Eun-pyo upset.
 Park Jin-ah as Park Yoo-jin 
 Science teacher in a gifted school where children attend.
 Na Hyun-woo as Jang Won-tae 
 His unusual relationship with Chun-hee.
 Shim So-young as Seo Jin-ha's housewife. 
 Oh Hee-joon as Detective Dong-shik

Production 
On May 26, 2021, it was confirmed that Lee Yo-won and Choo Ja-hyun would make a comeback with TV series Green Mothers' Club, directed by Ra Ha-na, written by Shin Yi-won, and produced by JTBC Studio. It is scheduled to be broadcast on JTBC in 2022, and the schedule is under discussion. The cast lineup was confirmed on July 2, 2021.

Original soundtrack

Part 1

Part 2

Part 3

Part 4

Viewership

References

External links
  
 
 
 
 

JTBC television dramas
Television series by JTBC Studios
2022 South Korean television series debuts
2022 South Korean television series endings
Korean-language Netflix exclusive international distribution programming